The Leydse Courant was a Dutch newspaper published from 1688 through 1992, initially only in Leiden and region and eventually it covered the entire province of South Holland. This catholic publication was one of the earlier newspapers in the Netherlands.

History

1668–1824: Leydse Courant
First publication of the Leydse Courant was in 1688. Until 1870 the newspaper appeared on Monday, Wednesday and Friday. Publisher was Anthony de Klopper & Zoon at the Breede Straat in Leiden.

1824–1870: Leydsche Courant
Cost of the newspaper in 1845 was 12 Dutch Guilder a year or 10 Guilder cents for an individual copy. Ads were 25 cent per line when commercial and 10 cent per line when noncommercial.

1870–1947: Leidsche Courant
In 1870, publication became a daily. At the start of the 20th century, the editorial office moved to Oude Singel 54.

In 1909, a subscription was 9 Guilder cent per week, 1.30 Guilder per 3 months, and one paid 20 to have the newspaper sent by mail. Single copies were 2.5 cent. Starting 1910 an illustrated Sunday paper appeared for 5 cent. On 1 October 1914, the newspaper moved to Steenschuur 15, and the subscription cost was raised to 10 cents per week. The newspaper remained in this building during the Second World War.

The newspaper was notified by the Roman Catholic Church on individuals who were about to get married. These young married received a free trial subscription that was then often renewed for pay.

1947–1992: Leidse Courant
At the end of 1971, mail subscriptions were dropped. In June 1972, the cost of individual copy was 35 cents, weekly subscription was 1.83 Guilder, while for an annual subscription one paid 91.55. Prices rose fast. In January 1974, the price for individual copies was raised to 40 cents, in June 1974 to 45 cents, in January 1975 to 50 cents, and in June 1976 to 55 cents.

When the newspaper folded in 1992, it had 14,000 subscriptions.

Defunct daily newspapers
1688 establishments in Europe
1992 disestablishments in Europe
Defunct newspapers published in the Netherlands
Mass media in Leiden
History of Leiden
Catholic newspapers
Daily newspapers published in the Netherlands